Horatious Adolphus "Pat" Kelly (6 August 1944 –  16 July 2019) was a Jamaican rocksteady and reggae singer, whose career began in the mid-1960s. He recorded as a solo artist and as a member of the vocal group the Techniques.

Biography

The Techniques
Kelly was born in Kingston in 1944. After leaving school, he spent a year studying electronics in Springfield, Massachusetts, United States during 1966, gaining a degree in audio electronics from Massachusetts Institute of Technology, before returning to Jamaica. He initially recorded as a solo artist for his former schoolmate, producer Bunny Lee. In 1967, when Slim Smith left The Techniques, Kelly was brought in to replace him, recording for Duke Reid in the rocksteady era when Reid's Treasure Isle studio/label was dominating Jamaican music. Kelly's falsetto voice, strongly influenced by the American soul singer Sam Cooke, in combination with Winston Riley and Bruce Ruffin, maintained the success that The Techniques had enjoyed with Smith. The Techniques first record with Kelly, "You Don't Care", adapted from Curtis Mayfield's "You'll Want Me Back", spent six weeks at number one in the Jamaican singles chart, and was followed by further hits.

Solo career
In 1968, Kelly went solo again, working again with Lee, and recording another Mayfield cover, "Little Boy Blue". He also recorded for Phil Pratt. Kelly's "How Long Will It Take" was the biggest-selling Jamaican single of 1969, and was the first Jamaican record to feature a string arrangement, which was overdubbed when it was released in the United Kingdom on the Palmer Brothers' Gas label. An album followed, the Lee "Scratch" Perry-engineered Pat Kelley Sings (sic), and Kelly was offered a £25,000 contract by Apple Records, which he was unable to accept due to existing contractual commitments. Kelly continued to record, having a big hits for producer Phil Pratt in 1972 with "Soulful Love" and "Talk About Love", and returning to record with Duke Reid, having another hit with a cover of John Denver's "Sunshine". He fell back on his earlier training, working as an engineer at several studios including Channel One and King Tubby's. He also moved into production, producing his own Youth and Youth album in 1978, and co-producing (with Holt) John Holt's The Impressable John Holt (Disco Mix) album in 1979. The late 1970s and early 1980s saw Kelly recording more regularly again, and he continued to record occasionally in the years that followed.

In the 1990s he was a member of a reformed Techniques, along with Lloyd Parks and Johnny Johnson. He continued to perform internationally up to 2018.

Kelly died on 16 July 2019, aged 74, from complications of kidney disease. He was survived by widow Ingrid, one son (Shawn) and four daughters (Cheryl, Pamela, Padeane, & Terri-Ann). He is buried at Dovecot Memorial Park and Crematory in St. Catherine.

Discography

Studio albums 
 Pat Kelley Sings (1969), Pama
 Give Love a Try (1978), Third World
 Youth and Youth (1978), Live & Love
 Lonely Man (1978), Burning Sounds
 Lovers Rock (1979), Third World (with Johnny Clarke and Hortense Ellis)
 One Man Stand (1979), Third World/Puff
 So Proud (1979), Burning Rockers/Chanan-Jah
 Cool Breezing (197?), Sunshot
 Wish It Would Rain (1980), Joe Gibbs
 From Both Sides (1980), Ita
 Sunshine (1980), KG Imperial
 Srevol (1983), Ethnic Fight UK
 Pat Kelly and Friends (1984), Chanan-Jah
 One In a Million (1984), Sky Note
 Ordinary Man (1987), Body Music
 Cry For You No More (1988), Blue Moon
 No Further Fears (2009), Tad's Record
 Are You For Real (with Los Aggrotones) (2012), Interrogator Records
 Love Songs (Jackpot, KGLP003).

Compilation albums 
 The Best of Pat Kelly (1983), Vista Sounds
 Butterflies, Sonic Sounds
 Classic Hits of Pat Kelly (1995), Rhino
 Classics (199?), Super Power
 Soulful Love - The Best Of (1997), Trojan (Pat Kelly & Friends)
 The Vintage Series (2000), VP

 Sings Classical Hits Galore, Striker Lee

References

External links 
 Pat Kelly at Roots Archives
 

1944 births
2019 deaths
Musicians from Kingston, Jamaica
Jamaican reggae musicians
Afro-Jamaican
Deaths from kidney disease
Massachusetts Institute of Technology alumni